Paolo Marchi (born 4 May 1991) is an Italian footballer who plays as a defender for  club Sangiuliano City.

Club career

Youth career
Born in Milan, Lombardy, Marchi started his career at hometown club F.C. Internazionale Milano from Pulcini A team (U11) in 2001–02 season to Allievi Nazionali U17 team  (National Student League) in 2007–08 season. As Inter closed down its Berretti U18 team in 2006, Marchi left for Chievo's Primavera U20 team ("Spring" team) instead of promoted to Inter's reserve directly. Chievo also signed Nestor Djengoue and Daniele Co on free transfer. Marchi was a regular for Chievo reserve as a fullback.

On 1 July 2009 Marchi returned to Inter's "spring" reserve. However Marchi failed to play any game. On 31 August 2010 Marchi left for Varese along with Matteo Romanini (who spent a year in Brescia) on free transfer, re-joining Inter teammate Matteo Bianchetti who just graduated from U17 team. Varese was the runner-up of the reserve league, losing to Roma 2–3. In the final Inter owned player Jaime Serrano was the left back instead as Marchi was suspended (2nd yellow card in the semi-finals)

Senior career
On 18 July 2011 Marchi left for Carpi in temporary deal. On 17 January 2012 Marchi changed to play for Casale. From 2012 to 2014 Marchi left for Calcio Como in temporary deals.

On 13 July 2014 he returned to Como for their pre-season camp.

On 26 August 2015 he was signed by Pordenone in a two-year contract.

On 17 July 2019 he signed a 2-year contract with Reggina. On 26 September 2020 he joined Ravenna on loan. On 1 February 2021, he moved to Piacenza. On 26 June 2021, he moved to Piacenza on a permanent basis, signing a two-year contract.

On 8 July 2022, he joined to Serie C club Sangiuliano City.

Honours
 National Student League: 2008
 National Junior League: 2006

References

External links
 Football.it Profile 
 
 

1991 births
Living people
Footballers from Milan
Italian footballers
Association football defenders
Serie C players
Inter Milan players
A.C. ChievoVerona players
S.S.D. Varese Calcio players
A.C. Carpi players
Casale F.B.C. players
Como 1907 players
Pordenone Calcio players
FeralpiSalò players
Reggina 1914 players
Ravenna F.C. players
Piacenza Calcio 1919 players
F.C. Sangiuliano City players